The Right Age to Marry is a 1935 British comedy film directed by Maclean Rogers and starring Frank Pettingell, Joyce Bland and Tom Helmore. It was made at Walton Studios as a quota quickie.

The screenplay concerns a wealthy northern cotton mill owner who retires to a southern seaside resort and tries to move amongst the upper-classes. He is targeted by a gold digger, but comes to realize he is really in love with his former housekeeper.

Cast
 Frank Pettingell as Lomas  
 Joyce Bland as Ellen  
 Tom Helmore as Stephen  
 Ruby Miller as Mrs. Carlisle  
 Moira Lynd as Carol  
 Hal Walters as Crowther  
 H. F. Maltby as Tetley  
 Gerald Barry as Major Locke 
 Isobel Scaife as Clara 
 Reginald Bates
 Vincent Holman

References

Bibliography
 Chibnall, Steve. Quota Quickies: The Birth of the British 'B' Film. British Film Institute, 2007.
 Low, Rachael. Filmmaking in 1930s Britain. George Allen & Unwin, 1985.
 Wood, Linda. British Films, 1927-1939. British Film Institute, 1986.

External links

1935 films
British comedy films
1935 comedy films
Films directed by Maclean Rogers
Quota quickies
Films shot at Nettlefold Studios
Films set in Lancashire
Films set in Brighton
British black-and-white films
1930s English-language films
1930s British films